The 2016 Apia International Sydney was a joint 2016 ATP World Tour and 2016 WTA Tour tennis tournament, played on outdoor hard courts in Sydney, New South Wales. It was the 123rd edition of the tournament and took place at the NSW Tennis Centre in Sydney, Australia. It was held from 10 January through 16 January 2016 as part of the Australian Open Series in preparation for the first Grand Slam of the year.

Point distribution

Prize money

1Qualifiers prize money is also the Round of 32 prize money.
*per team

ATP singles main-draw entrants

Seeds 

1 Rankings as of January 4, 2016

Other entrants 
The following players received wildcards into the singles main draw:
  James Duckworth
  John Millman
  Jordan Thompson

The following players received entry from the qualifying draw:
  Mikhail Kukushkin
  Nicolas Mahut
  Maximilian Marterer
  Alexander Sarkissian

The following player received entry as a lucky loser:
  Íñigo Cervantes

Withdrawals 
Before the tournament
  Janko Tipsarević → replaced by  Simone Bolelli
  Julien Benneteau (groin injury, late withdrawal) → replaced by  Íñigo Cervantes

Retirements 
  Martin Kližan (left shoulder injury)
  Dominic Thiem (blisters)
  Bernard Tomic

ATP doubles main-draw entrants

Seeds 

1 Rankings as of January 4, 2016

Other entrants 
The following pairs received wildcards into the doubles main draw:
  James Duckworth /  John Millman
  Matt Reid /  Jordan Thompson

The following pair received entry as alternates:
  Teymuraz Gabashvili /  Mikhail Kukushkin

Withdrawals 
Before the tournament
  Dominic Inglot (abdominal pain)

WTA singles main-draw entrants

Seeds 

1 Rankings as of January 4, 2016.

Other entrants 
The following players received wildcards into the singles main draw:
  Ana Ivanovic
  Tammi Patterson
  Tsvetana Pironkova

The following players received entry from the qualifying draw:
  Lara Arruabarrena
  Daniela Hantuchová
  Mirjana Lučić-Baroni
  Monica Puig

The following players received entry as lucky losers:
  Polona Hercog
  Lucie Hradecká
  Magdaléna Rybáriková

Withdrawals 
Before the tournament
  Irina-Camelia Begu → replaced by  CoCo Vandeweghe
  Daria Gavrilova (left abdominal muscle injury) → replaced by  Magdaléna Rybáriková
  Madison Keys → replaced by  Caroline Garcia
  Petra Kvitová (gastrointestinal illness) → replaced by  Lucie Hradecká
  Agnieszka Radwańska (left leg injury) → replaced by  Polona Hercog
  Lucie Šafářová → replaced by  Lesia Tsurenko

During the tournament
  Angelique Kerber (gastrointestinal illness)

Retirements 
  Belinda Bencic (Gastrointestinal illness)

WTA doubles main-draw entrants

Seeds 

1 Rankings as of January 4, 2016.

Withdrawals 
Before the tournament
  Julia Görges (left abdominal muscle injury)

Champions

Men's singles 

  Viktor Troicki def.  Grigor Dimitrov 2–6, 6–1, 7–6(9–7)

Women's singles 

  Svetlana Kuznetsova def.  Monica Puig, 6–0, 6–2.

Men's doubles 

  Jamie Murray /  Bruno Soares def.  Rohan Bopanna /  Florin Mergea, 6–3, 7–6(8–6).

Women's doubles 

  Martina Hingis /  Sania Mirza def.  Caroline Garcia /  Kristina Mladenovic, 1–6, 7–5, [10–5].

Broadcast
Selected matches aired in Australia on 7Two, with live coverage of both day and night sessions. Every match was also available to be streamed live through a free 7Tennis mobile app.

References

External links 
 Official website

 
Apia International Sydney, 2016